Andrea Papetti (born 3 July 2002) is an Italian professional footballer who plays as a centre back for Serie B club Brescia Calcio.

Club career 
Papetti is an exponent from Brescia Calcio youth academy.

He made his Serie A debut aged 18, on 9 March 2020. He played 90 minutes as a center back against U.S. Sassuolo.

Career statistics

Club 

 As of match played 26 February 2022

References 

2002 births
Brescia Calcio players
Italian footballers
Living people
Association football central defenders